Hale Center High School is a public high school located in the city of Hale Center, Texas, USA and classified as a 2A school by the UIL.  It is a part of the Hale Center Independent School District located in central Hale County.   In 2015, the school was rated "Met Standard" by the Texas Education Agency.

Athletics
The Hale Center Owls compete in these sports 

Cross Country, Football, Basketball, Powerlifting, Tennis, Track, Baseball & Softball

State Titles
Girls Basketball - 
1979(1A)

Notable graduates
Jo-Carroll Dennison (1940), Miss America 1942 and actress

References

External links
Hale Center ISD website

Public high schools in Texas
Schools in Hale County, Texas